This article details the Catalans Dragons rugby league football club's 2015 season. This was the Dragons 11th season in the Super League after they entered through the franchise system, becoming the first successful team.

Table

To be inputted.

2016 fixtures and results

2016 Super League Fixtures

2016 Super 8's

Player appearances
Super League Only

 = Injured

 = Suspended

Challenge Cup

Player appearances
Challenge Cup Games only

2016 squad statistics

 Appearances and points include (Super League, Challenge Cup and Play-offs) as of 28 March 2016.

 = Injured
 = Suspended

2016 transfers in/out

In

Out

References

External links
Catalans Dragons Website
Catalans Dragons - SL Website

Catalans Dragons seasons
Super League XXI by club
2016 in French rugby league